Vroutek is a town in Louny District in the Ústí nad Labem Region of the Czech Republic. It has about 1,800 inhabitants.

Administrative parts
Villages of Lužec, Mlýnce, Mukoděly, Skytaly, Vesce, Vidhostice and Vrbička are administrative parts of Vroutek.

Geography
The eastern part of the municipal territory with the town proper lies in the Rakovník Uplands. The Blšanka River flows through the southern part of the territory.

History
The first written mention of Měcholupy is from 1227, when the village was owned by Kojata IV Hrabišic. In the 14th century, it was acquired by the monastery in Postoloprty and sometime during that time it was promoted to a town.

Culture
Vroutek is home to several open-air events, including the Rock for Churchill festival.

Sights
The Church of Saint James the Great is a Romanesque building from the 1220s, modified at the end of the 16th century. It belongs to the most valuable monuments in the region. In the Middle Ages, it formed a fortified complex together with a stronghold.

The Church of Saint John the Baptist was built in the Baroque style in 1726.

References

External links

Populated places in Louny District
Cities and towns in the Czech Republic